Hoćevina is a village in the municipality of Pljevlja, Montenegro.

Demographics
According to the 2003 census, the village had a population of 167 people.

[According to the 2011 census, its population was 123.

References

Populated places in Pljevlja Municipality